Bearhouse Township, Arkansas may refer to:

 Bearhouse Township, Ashley County, Arkansas
 Bearhouse Township, Drew County, Arkansas

See also 
 List of townships in Arkansas

Arkansas township disambiguation pages